The name Wanda has been used for eleven tropical cyclones worldwide. 

In the Atlantic: 
 Tropical Storm Wanda (2021), a weak storm that meandered in the open Atlantic; developed from an extratropical nor'easter that affected much of the Northeastern United States.

In the Eastern Pacific:
 Tropical Storm Wanda (1959), never threatened land. 

In the Western Pacific:
 Tropical Storm Wanda (1945) (T4520)
 Typhoon Wanda (1951) (T5121)
 Typhoon Wanda (1956) (T5612, 08W), a destructive typhoon that made landfall in eastern China near Zhoushan, Zhejiang.
 Typhoon Wanda (1962) (T6259), Category 2 typhoon that made landfall in Hong Kong.
 Typhoon Wanda (1965) (T6508, 06W) 
 Typhoon Wanda (1967) (T6730, 26W)
 Typhoon Wanda (1971) (T7104, 04W, Diding)
 Tropical Storm Wanda (1974) (T7401, 01W, Atang)
 Tropical Storm Wanda (1977) (T7706, 08W)

Atlantic hurricane set index articles
Pacific typhoon set index articles
Pacific hurricane set index articles